Jean E. Ellison (July 8, 1890 – death date unknown), nicknamed "Early Bird", was an American Negro league catcher in the 1910s.

A native of Paola, Kansas, Ellison made his Negro leagues debut in 1915 with the Chicago American Giants. He went on to play for the Leland Giants in 1917.

References

External links
 and Seamheads

1890 births
Year of death missing
Place of death missing
Chicago American Giants players
Leland Giants players
Baseball catchers
Baseball players from Kansas
People from Paola, Kansas